Windisch is a German surname. Notable people with the surname include:

Albert Windisch (1878–1967) German painter and typographer
Alois Windisch (1888–1958), Austrian military officer
Erich Windisch (1918–2007), German ski jumper
Ernst Windisch (1844–1918), German scholar, linguist and Celticist
Karl Gottlieb von Windisch (1725–1793), Mayor of Pressburg, historian and writer
Markus Windisch (born 1984), Italian biathlete
Rudolf Windisch (1897–1918), World War I fighter ace
Veronika Windisch (born 1982), Austrian speed skater

See also
Windisch-Graetz, a princely family in the Austrian Empire

German-language surnames